Homona issikii is a moth of the family Tortricidae. It is found in China, the Russian Far East, Japan and Taiwan.

The wingspan is 20 mm. There are two generations per year in China with adults appearing in late May.

The larvae feed on Cryptomeria fortunei and Cryptomeria japonica. The species overwinters as a young larva within the leaves of dying branches. The larvae begin to be active early April of the following year. Newly hatched larvae usually feed on leaf flesh and only the epidermis remains. Later instars web several shoots together to form a temporary nest, and feed on the leaves and epidermis of the shoot from within their nest. Pupation takes place within the nest.

References

Moths described in 1962
Homona (moth)
Moths of Japan